Yegor Valentinovich Shamov (born 2 June 1994) is a Russian football goalkeeper. He plays for FC Arsenal Tula.

Club career
He made his debut in the Russian Second Division for FC Biolog-Novokubansk on 9 August 2013 in a game against FC Vityaz Krymsk.

He made his Russian Premier League debut for FC Arsenal Tula on 26 October 2019 in a game against FC Akhmat Grozny.

Career statistics

References

External links
 
 
 

1994 births
Footballers from Moscow
Living people
Russian footballers
Association football goalkeepers
FC Dynamo Bryansk players
FC Luch Vladivostok players
FC Arsenal Tula players
FC Khimik-Arsenal players
Russian Premier League players
Russian First League players
Russian Second League players